The 2002 French motorcycle Grand Prix was the fourth round of the 2002 MotoGP Championship. It took place on the weekend of 17–19 May 2002 at the Bugatti Circuit located in Le Mans, France.

MotoGP classification
Jean-Michel Bayle replaced Garry McCoy from the second practice session.

The race was stopped for rain after 21 of the 28 scheduled laps; however sufficient distance was covered in order for full points to be awarded.

250 cc classification

125 cc classification

Championship standings after the race (MotoGP)

Below are the standings for the top five riders and constructors after round four has concluded.

Riders' Championship standings

Constructors' Championship standings

 Note: Only the top five positions are included for both sets of standings.

References

French motorcycle Grand Prix
French
Motorcycle Grand Prix